Annie Wallace (born 6 May 1965) is a British actress, known for portraying the role of Sally St. Claire in the Channel 4 soap opera Hollyoaks, a role she has portrayed since 2015. She is the first transgender person to portray a regular transgender character in British soap opera history.

Life and career
Wallace was previously a member of the National Youth Theatre in 1981, but she temporarily stopped acting to work in computer science and sound engineering. After eighteen months as a research assistant for the ITV soap opera Coronation Street, from 1998 to 2000, where she advised for and inspired the character of Hayley Patterson (later Cropper), she auditioned successfully for the Manchester School of Theatre in 2001, graduating in 2004. She then appeared in various Manchester theatre productions, including Withnail and I and Wyrd Sisters. In 2011, she appeared in an episode of Shameless as school headmistress Miss Heller. Wallace is also a musician, with two albums written and recorded with collaborator John Beresford. She has also worked on several podcast comedy series, as well as sound and video design for various theatrical productions.

On 9 October 2015, it was announced that she would be joining the Channel 4 soap opera Hollyoaks, in a new regular role as Sally St. Claire. Wallace made her first appearance on 29 October 2015.

On 5 January 2018, Wallace took part in an edition of Celebrity Mastermind, where her specialist subject was "Doctor Who – 1970–1980". She came in second place with 21 points, losing to journalist Martin Bell with 24 points. Her chosen charity was Mermaids.

Filmography

Awards and nominations
On 15 November 2015, she was placed at number 17 on the Rainbow List, published by The Independent on Sunday; a list of the most influential openly LGBTI individuals in the United Kingdom, published annually. On 25 June 2016, Wallace was placed at number 39 on the Pride Power List, published by Out News Global as part of Pride in London; another list of in celebration of the achievements of 100 most influential lesbian, gay, bisexual, transgender and intersex people in Britain, voted for by the public. On 16 September 2016, she won The National Diversity Awards "Celebrity of the Year" award, at Liverpool Cathedral. On the same day she was placed at No.38 on the DIVA Power List. On 5 October 2016, she was nominated in the BAFTA Scotland Awards 2016 in the category of "Best Actress - Television" for her role in Hollyoaks; the first ever British transgender actress to be nominated for a BAFTA award.
On 2 October 2021 she was presented with the Judges Award for Outstanding Trans Activism at the Proud Scotland Awards.

References

External links
 
 

1965 births
Living people
Actresses from Aberdeen
21st-century Scottish actresses
National Youth Theatre members
Alumni of Manchester Metropolitan University
Scottish television actresses
Scottish soap opera actresses
Scottish stage actresses
Scottish LGBT actors
Transgender actresses
20th-century Scottish LGBT people
21st-century Scottish LGBT people
People educated at Aberdeen Grammar School